"Lucky Star" is a song by American singer Madonna from her 1983 self-titled debut studio album. Written by her, the song was first released in the United Kingdom as a single on September 9, 1983, making it overall the fourth song released commercially off the album. In the United States, "Lucky Star" served as the album's fifth and final single after the release of "Borderline". It was then included on Madonna's greatest hits albums The Immaculate Collection (1990) and Celebration (2009). Originally, the song was produced by Reggie Lucas, but Madonna was not impressed by his final version, so she called her then-boyfriend John "Jellybean" Benitez to remix it according to her ideas.

"Lucky Star" is a medium-paced dance song and combines the heavy beats of a drum with the sounds of a guitar played in a high riff. The lyrics juxtapose the male body with the heavenly stars in the sky. Music critics praised the song, heralding it as the introduction to upbeat dance music. The song was a commercial success; in the United States, it peaked at number four on the Billboard Hot 100, becoming Madonna's first top-five and second top-ten single after "Borderline". It also topped the Dance Club Songs chart along with "Holiday". Internationally, "Lucky Star" reached the top ten in Canada, and the top 20 in Ireland and the United Kingdom.

The music video portrayed Madonna dancing in front of a white background, accompanied by two dancers. After the video was released, Madonna's style and mannerisms became a fashion trend among the younger generation. Scholars noted that in the video, Madonna portrayed herself as narcissistic and an ambiguous character; they felt she referred to herself as the lucky star, unlike the lyrical meaning of the song. The artist has performed the song in four of her concert tours, the last being the Rebel Heart Tour (2015–2016). It has also been covered by a number of artists around the world.

Background 

In 1983, Madonna was recording her first studio album with Warner Music producer Reggie Lucas. However, she did not have enough new material to ensure a full LP album, so Lucas produced for her a number of songs, namely "Borderline", "Burning Up", "Physical Attraction", "I Know It", "Think of Me" and lastly "Lucky Star". The song was written by Madonna for Mark Kamins, who had promised her to play the track at Danceteria, the club where he worked at as a DJ. However, the track was instead used for the singer's debut album, which she planned to call Lucky Star. She believed that "Lucky Star", along with "Borderline", were the "perfect foundation" for the album. However, problems arose after recording the song; Madonna was unhappy with the way the final version turned out. According to her, Lucas used too many instruments and did not consider her ideas for the songs. This led to a dispute between the two and, after finishing the album, Lucas left the project without altering the songs to Madonna's specifications. Hence, Madonna brought her then boyfriend John "Jellybean" Benitez to remix "Borderline" and "Lucky Star", along with some of the other recorded tracks. In a later interview, Benitez reflected back on the recording sessions and commented,
She was unhappy with the whole damn thing, so I went in and sweetened up a lot of music for her, adding some guitars to 'Lucky Star', some voices, some magic. [...] I just wanted to do the best job I could do for her. When we would play back 'Holiday' or 'Lucky Star', you could see that she was overwhelmed by how great it all sounded. You wanted to help her, you know? As much as she could be a bitch, when you were in groove with her, it was very cool, very creative.
"Lucky Star" was initially decided to be released as the third single from the album, but "Holiday" had already become a dance-hit in the United States. Hence it was released as the fourth single from the album. Music executive Jeff Ayeroff, who was instrumental in green-lighting her career, recalled how she initially didn't want to release "Lucky Star" as a single. He says that around that time Madonna was getting sued and needed money, so he told her "Let me release 'Lucky Star', and I guarantee that you'll sell enough records to pay that off". According to Ayeroff, he was right because "'Lucky Star' broke the first album wide open".

Composition 

Musically a medium-paced dance track, "Lucky Star" starts off with a sparkle of synth note and is followed by heavy beats of electronic drum and handclaps. A guitar is played in high riff and a bubbling bass synth is produced to accompany the guitar sound. The song revolves around the "star light, star bright" hook for more than a minute, before going to the chorus. According to author Rikky Rooksby, the lyrics are repetitive and inane and revolves around the transparent ambiguity of the stars and juxtaposition of the male character with being a heavenly body in the sky. "Lucky Star" is set in the time signature of common time with a moderate dance tempo of 108 beats per minute. It is set in the key of G major with Madonna's voice spanning from the tonal nodes of G3 to F5. The song has a basic sequence of G–A–B–D–E–F as its basic chord progression.

Critical reception 

Critical response towards "Lucky Star" has been generally positive. Author J. Randy Taraborrelli, in his biography of Madonna, called it "fluffy, dance-able, but forgettable." However he praised its ingenuity, which he credited to have come from its "simplicity" and dance-music nature. Author Rikky Rooksby pointed out Madonna's "cutesy" vocals and compared them to those of Cyndi Lauper. Simon Gage, on his book Queer, deemed "Lucky Star" a "happy disco number". The song was appreciated by authors Santiago Fouz-Hernández and Freya Jarman-Ivens, who complimented it in their book Madonna's Drowned Worlds. They noted that with songs like "Lucky Star" and "Burning Up", Madonna was introducing a "style of upbeat dance music that would prove particularly appealing to future gay audiences." English tenor and academic John Potter, in his book The Cambridge companion to singing, praised its sound but criticized the reverb and double tracking, which he believed "de-personalized" it.

Bill Lamb from About.com described the song, along with "Holiday" and "Borderline", as "state of the art dance-pop" and praised their "irresistible" pop hooks. From AllMusic, Stephen Thomas Erlewine called it one of the album's highlights and called it "effervescent"; also from AllMusic, Stewart Mason criticized it for being "dead simple" and having an "absolutely bare-bones arrangement and antiseptically clean production, but for some reason, it works. It's near impossible to hear this song without dancing". Slants Sal Cinquemani commented that the song had "unknowingly prefaced her recent foray into the glittery halls of electronic-pop". From the same magazine, Eric Henderson said it "sets the tone [of the album] right off the bat" and called it a "sonic monster worthy of David Mancuso's fine-tuned system at the Loft". On the same vein, the staff of Rolling Stone called it the "perfect" album opener. On their reviews of The Immaculate Collection (1990), David Browne from Entertainment Weekly complimented the remixed version of the song, while rock critic Robert Christgau called it "blessed". Matthew Hocter from music portal Albumism, highlighted its "catchy, semi-vacuous" lyrics.

According to the staff from The Advocate, it's an "enjoyable earworm". The Arizona Republics Ed Masley noted how "young and innocent" the singer sounded and concluded that "sometimes a sassy delivery and a slinky post-Chic disco groove is all it takes to launch a proper pop sensation". He named it Madonna's 9th greatest song. Louis Virtel from The Backlot considered it her 19th best song, calling it "so determinedly chipper that you might forget its naughtiest element – the way Madonna croons", and compared it to Prince's 1991 song "Gett Off", with the exception that "Lucky Star" is "softer [and] sexier". For Matthew Jacobs from the HuffPost, it's the singer's 12th best single and her "most '80s-sounding hit". Similarly, Gay Star News Joe Morgan deemed it "pure ingenue. Pop at its most 80s". Samuel R. Murrian from Parade deemed it her 14th best and PinkNews Mayer Nissim her 16th; the latter wrote: "If 'Holiday' was a statement of pop intent, 'Lucky Star' underlined that statement in silver and gold glitter pen [...] [they're both] jagged slices of irresistible disco funk that anticipate[s] her future hook-up with Nile Rodgers".  Billboard also deemed it Madonna's 16th greatest song; Katie Atkinson said it was an "irresistible dance hit" and a "nightclub nursery rhyme". The author went on to praise the singer's composition, which took the simplicity of a nursery rhyme and turned it into a "radio-ready earworm". Finally, Entertainment Weeklys Chuck Arnold opined it was a "radiant twirler [that] feels as if it comes equipped with its own disco ball".

Commercial reception 
"Lucky Star" was released in the United States as the album's fifth single on August 8, 1984 after "Borderline" had become her first top-ten hit. It entered the Hot 100 at number 49 the week of August 25 and, eighteen weeks later, peaked at number 4. The week of August 27 it entered, alongside "Holiday", at number 31 on Billboards Dance Club Songs chart. One month later, it reached the top of the chart, becoming Madonna's very first chart-topper there. It was able to enter other Billboard charts, such as Hot Adult Contemporary and Hot R&B/Hip-Hop Songs, where it peaked at 19 and 42 respectively. In Canada, "Lucky Star" debuted at number 89 of the RPM singles chart, the week of September 22. It peaked at number eight in November and remained in the chart for 19 weeks. It placed at number 72 on the RPM year-end chart for 1984.

In the United Kingdom, it was released on September 9, 1983 simultaneously with "Holiday" in the United States; however, it failed to chart in the country (peaking at no. 170). In March 1984, it was re-issued and debuted on the UK Singles Chart at number 47, eventually peaking at 14 after three weeks; it remained on the chart for nine weeks. In August 2008, the Official Charts Company reported that "Lucky Star" had sold 117,470 copies in the UK. In Ireland and Australia, the song peaked at number 19 and 36, respectively.

Music video

Background and synopsis 

The music video for "Lucky Star" was directed by Arthur Pierson, and produced by Glenn Goodwin; Wayne Isham was in charge of photography. Originally, Mary Lambert, then a Rhode Island School of Design graduate, was appointed director, but was soon replaced by Pierson. Warner Bros. gave him a small budget for shooting, which took place in Los Angeles in February 1984. Madonna's brother Christopher Ciccone and Erika Belle appeared in the video as dancers; Ciccone recalled that "[Madonna] asked us to dance in her 'Lucky Star' video [...] We shoot at the old Charlie Chaplin studio [...] I get paid just $200 and don't get any royalties either. However, at the time, I am happy just to be a part of it. The camaraderie between Madonna, Erika, Martin [Burgoyne], and me is enough for me".

In the video, Madonna wore a black outfit consisting of mesh crop top, fingerless lace gloves, skirt over leggings, and stars and crucifixes dangling from her ears and around her waist. Although Belle was credited with coming up with the ensemble, biographer Mary Cross noted that Madonna was wearing her "day-to-day" clothing. At the time of the song's release, Madonna's style of dress was catching on as a fashion statement among club kids and her fans. The most prominent among her fashion accessories were the crucifixes she wore as earrings, necklaces, and bangles. Madonna commented that wearing a rosary and a crucifix was "kind of offbeat and interesting. I mean, everything I do is sort of tongue-in-cheek. Besides, [the crucifixes] seem to go with my name." In reality, she was trying to find a distinctive image for herself, being inspired by artists like Boy George, Cyndi Lauper, and David Bowie, who were constantly shifting their image and persona. Madonna would go on to realize the importance of her music videos, and their rotation on MTV was instrumental in popularizing her image. "Lucky Star" was then included on Madonna's music video compilations The Immaculate Collection (1990) and Celebration: The Video Collection (2009).

The video starts with the close-up of Madonna's face, as she slides her sunglasses down her nose. This scene was a reference to the character of Lolita in Stanley Kubrick's 1962 film of the same name, and Audrey Hepburn in the movie Breakfast at Tiffany's (1961). The image then fades to white, denoting the celestial stars dazzle, and then resumes itself in color. Madonna is shown dancing with her brother and Belle against a plain white background, along with closeups of her mesmerized gaze. The video ends with the initial black-and-white image repeated, but in retrograde, as Madonna puts back on the sunglasses. The taking down and putting up of those sunglasses provided a frame to contain the song, functioning like a curtain that marks the opening and closing of a stage performance.

Analysis and reception 
Dance historian Sally Banes, in her book Before, between, and beyond: three decades of dance writing, noted that the video portrayed Madonna as both the subject and the object of the song. She believed that in the video, Madonna taking off her sunglasses symbolized herself as a movie star, thus creating an ambiguous characterization of herself, and a narcissistic theme. Author Peter Goodwin, in his book Television under the Tories: Broadcasting Policy 1979–1997, commented that although "Lucky Star" is not a narrative video, in the clip Madonna plays at least four characters:—the person in sunglasses looking; a break-dancing girl; an androgynous social dancer; and a seductress. The juxtaposition of all these characterizations portray Madonna as a narcissistic self-lover. Images of Madonna's body writhing against the white background generates the question whether she is addressing her lover or herself in the song. Adam Sexton, author of Desperately Seeking Madonna: In Search of the Meaning of the World's Most Famous Woman, noted that although the video seems to be made for a "male fetishistic gaze", Madonna takes control of "what is to be looked at and how it is to be looked at" by mockingly opening her mouth and flicking her tongue. For The Quietus, Matthew Lindsay opined the video was a showcase for "Madonna as auto-erotic magnet [...] full of belly button close-ups and narcissistic strutting". Times John Skow noted that "[s]he's sexy, but she doesn't need men [...] she's kind of there all by herself".

AllMusic's Stewart Mason deemed the video "about 500 times sexier than the entire Sex coffee table book". Samuel R. Murrian said it marked the moment the singer became a "style trendsetter". Matthew Jacobs highlighted the singer's "seminal look" and said that it "spawned the bulk of the copycat costumes still seen at Halloween parties far and wide" and made her a fashion icon. Idolators Mike Nied considered it her 19th greatest music video, praising its "classic '80s vibes" and said it was "evidence of the then-rising star’s undeniable appeal". Louis Virtel from The Backlot also placed it in the 19th position of his ranking of Madonna's videos; he wrote that "even on a stark white backdrop, Madonna is a resplendent shooting star", highlighting her "hungry stare" and dance moves.

 Live performances 

"Lucky Star" was included in four of Madonna's concert tours: The Virgin Tour (1985), Who's That Girl (1987), Confessions (2006), and Rebel Heart (2015–2016). On the Virgin Tour, Madonna performed the song wearing a black ensemble consisting of a crop top beneath a vest with a silver cross pattée, matching fringed elbow length gloves and miniskirt, leggings, low-heeled leather boots, and a crucifix earring in one ear. The performance of the song at Detroit's Cobo Arena was included on the Madonna Live: The Virgin Tour video release (1985). Two years later, it was sung as the second number of the Who's That Girl World Tour; the performance found the artist singing underneath a disco ball hung from above the stage. She was decked out in the same black bustier from her "Open Your Heart" (1987) video, and her hair was platinum blonde and done in a big bushy style. From the Chicago Tribune, Scott A. Zamost and Elizabeth Snead felt that, although Madonna's vocals sounded strong, she was "drowned out frequently and annoyingly by an overpowering back-up band" in numbers such as "Lucky Star". Two different performances from the tour can be found on the releases Ciao Italia: Live from Italy, filmed at Stadio Communale in Turin, Italy on September 4, and Who's That Girl: Live in Japan, filmed at Korakuen Stadium in Tokyo, Japan on June 22.

On 2006's Confessions Tour, the singer performed a "modernized" version of the song. She wore a one-shouldered unitard with ribbons of purple Swarovski crystals across the torso, similar to the one worn by the singers of ABBA, designed by Jean Paul Gaultier, as well as a white satin cape, lit from the inside, that had "Dancing Queen" embroidered on the back. Following the performance of "La Isla Bonita" (1987), Madonna lies face-down on the stage; afterwards, two backup singers wrap the cape around her and, together, proceed to perform "Lucky Star". Towards the end, the original beat of the song slowly begins to morph into "Hung Up" (2005), the concert's final number. Slants Sal Cinquemani praised this new arrangement, while the Boston Herald felt it "transcended the original’s teeny-bopping tone". The performance from the August 15-16 London concerts was included on the singer's second live album The Confessions Tour (2007).

For the Rebel Heart Tour (2015–2016), the singer performed a slow, cumbia and salsa-fueled medley of "Dress You Up", "Into The Groove" (1985) and "Lucky Star". The number featured Day of the Dead iconography and found Madonna, decked out in a long dress with a black shawl and a black hat, joined by a Mexican-themed dance crew. Billboards Joe Lynch opined that "the maracas might have been a little much, but the crisp Spanish guitar successfully made the songs sound newly organic"; Rob Sheffield, from Rolling Stone, praised the "generous and unhurried medley".

Covers and media appearances

The 2000 tribute album Virgin Voices: A Tribute To Madonna, Vol. 2 included a trip hop cover of the song by Switchblade Symphony; AllMusic's Heather Phares highlighted it as one of the album's finest moments. Seven years later, a folk music cover by Alexandra Hope was included on Through the Wilderness. Carly Rae Jepsen sampled the track on her 2017 single "Cut to the Feeling". "Lucky Star" was featured in the 1988 movie Running on Empty, in a scene where River Phoenix's character is attending music class. It was also used in Snatch (2000), directed by Guy Ritchie, who was married to Madonna from 2000 to 2008. The music video was referenced in Quentin Tarantino's 1994 film Pulp Fiction, in a scene where Fabienne (Maria de Medeiros) tells her boyfriend (Bruce Willis) that she wants a pot belly "like Madonna when she did 'Lucky Star'". It was mentioned on American television series Modern Family; Mitchell Pritchett (Jesse Tyler Ferguson) reveals that when he was 12, his father caught him dancing to the song, which he refers to as "the most embarrassing thing that a boy can do". In 2019, "Lucky Star" was used in the fifth episode of the first season of Euphoria. In the 2022 animated film Luck, Eva Noblezada covered "Lucky Star" with additional vocals by Alana Da Fonseca, and it was included in the soundtrack released with the film by Milan Records.

Track listing and formats

 US 7" single A. "Lucky Star" (7" Edit) - 3:44
 B. "I Know It" (LP Version) - 3:45
 US 12" single A. "Lucky Star" (New Mix) - 7:15
 B. "I Know It" (LP Version) - 3:45
 UK 12" single A. "Lucky Star" (Full Length Version) - 5:38
 B. "I Know It" - 3:47

 US 12" single – Promo Only A. "Lucky Star" - 5:30
 B. "Holiday" - 6:08
 Germany / UK CD Maxi-Single (1995)'''
 "Lucky Star" (U.S. Remix) - 7:15
 "I Know It" - 3:47

Credits and personnel
 Madonna – vocals, writer
 Reggie Lucas – producer
 John "Jellybean" Benitez – audio mixing
 Fred Zarr – synthesizer, electric and acoustic piano
 Dean Gant – synthesizer, electric and acoustic piano
 Ira Siegal – guitar
 Leslie Ming – LinnDrum and Oberheim DMX claps
 Bobby Malach – tenor saxophone

Credits adapted from the Madonna'' album liner notes.

Charts

Weekly charts

Year-end charts

See also
 List of number-one dance singles of 1983 (U.S.)

References

Bibliography

External links
 

1983 singles
1983 songs
Madonna songs
Post-disco songs
Sire Records singles
Songs written by Madonna
Song recordings produced by Reggie Lucas
Warner Records singles